The 2012–13 Top League Challenge Series was the 2012–13 edition of the Top League Challenge Series, a second-tier rugby union competition in Japan, in which teams from regionalised leagues competed for promotion to the Top League for the 2013–14 season. The competition was contested from 9 December 2012 to 20 January 2013.

Coca-Cola West Red Sparks and Kubota Spears won promotion to the 2013–14 Top League, while Mitsubishi Sagamihara DynaBoars and Toyota Industries Shuttles progressed to the promotion play-offs.

Competition rules and information

The top two teams from the regional Top East League, Top West League and Top Kyūshū League qualified to the Top League Challenge Series. The regional league winners participated in Challenge 1, while the runners-up participated in Challenge 2. The winner of Challenge 2 also progressed to a four-team Challenge 1.

The top two teams in Challenge 1 won automatic promotion to the 2013–14 Top League, while the third and fourth-placed teams qualified to the promotion play-offs.

Qualification

The teams qualified to the Challenge 1 and Challenge 2 series through the 2012 regional leagues.

Top West League

The final standings for the 2012 Top West League were:

 Chubu Electric Power, Honda Heat, Osaka Police and Toyota Industries Shuttles qualified to the Second Phase.

 Toyota Industries Shuttles qualified for Challenge 1.
 Honda Heat qualified for Challenge 2.

Top East League

The final standings for the 2012 Top East League were:

 Kubota Spears qualified for Challenge 1.
 Mitsubishi Sagamihara DynaBoars qualified for Challenge 2.

Top Kyūshū League

The final standings for the 2012 Top Kyūshū League were:

 Chugoku Electric Power, Coca-Cola West Red Sparks and Mazda Blue Zoomers qualified to the Second Phase.
 Fukuoka Bank and Yamagataya were relegated to lower leagues.

 Coca-Cola West Red Sparks qualified for Challenge 1.
 Mazda Blue Zoomers qualified for Challenge 2.

Challenge 1

Standings

The final standings for the 2012–13 Top League Challenge 1 were:

 Coca-Cola West Red Sparks and Kubota Spears won promotion to the 2013–14 Top League.
 Mitsubishi Sagamihara DynaBoars and Toyota Industries Shuttles progressed to the promotion play-offs.

Matches

The following matches were played in the 2012–13 Top League Challenge 1:

Challenge 2

Standings

The final standings for the 2012–13 Top League Challenge 2 were:

 Mitsubishi Sagamihara DynaBoars progressed to Challenge 1.

Matches

The following matches were played in the 2012–13 Top League Challenge 2:

See also

 2012–13 Top League
 Top League Challenge Series

References

2012-13 Challenge
2012–13 in Japanese rugby union
2012–13 rugby union tournaments for clubs